Katrin Zschau (born 9 June 1976) is a German politician of the Social Democratic Party (SPD) who has been serving as a member of the Bundestag since the 2021 German federal election, representing the constituency of Rostock – Landkreis Rostock II.

Political career 
Zschau joined the SPD in 2018. She became a member of the Bundestag in the 2021 elections. In parliament, she has since been serving on the Committee on Education, Research and Technology Assessment and the Committee on Economic Affairs and Climate Action.

References 

Living people
1976 births
People from Greifswald
Members of the Bundestag for the Social Democratic Party of Germany
Members of the Bundestag 2021–2025
Female members of the Bundestag
21st-century German women politicians